Robert Roth may refer to:

Robert Roth (activist) (born 1950), American anti-war, anti-racism and anti-imperialism activist and educator
Robert Roth (sport wrestler) (1898–1959), Swiss wrestler 
Robert Roth (musician) (born 1966), songwriter, vocalist and guitarist for Truly
Braggo Roth (Robert Frank Roth, 1892–1936), baseball player
Bobby Roth (born 1950), television and film director, screenwriter and producer
Robert A. Roth (born 1947), publisher and art collector, founder of Chicago Reader
Robert S. Roth (1926–2012), American materials scientist researched on ceramic materials